St-Pierre-Jolys (formerly Rivière-aux-Rats/Rat River, St-Pierre/St. Pierre) is a village in the Canadian province of Manitoba, located  southeast of Winnipeg on Highway 59 near the Rat River. It is surrounded by the Rural Municipality of De Salaberry, and the nearest communities to it are Steinbach, St. Malo, Morris and Niverville.

Agriculture is the dominant industry: primarily dairy farming and livestock. Being important sectors for the life of the community, the local businesses, services, and hospitality are strong.

Tourism is also important to the village: the former Crow Wing Trail is now part of the Trans-Canada Trail, and St. Pierre-Jolys hosts several popular festivals, such as la Cabane à Sucre (maple syrup festival) in April; le Festival Chantecler, a celebration of Francophone arts; and the signature St-Pierre-Jolys Frog Follies and Ag Fair (les Folies Grenouilles et Foire Agricoles), a village fair featuring the Canadian frog jumping competition.

There are 3 schools, a hospital, and a sizable Royal Canadian Mounted Police detachment in the village.

Bilingual St-Pierre-Jolys has collaborated with nearby St. Malo on several ventures, including a trade show and a hockey league.

The dramatic sequences for the 2012 documentary We Were Children were shot there.

History 
Part of the 19th-century Crow Wing Trail linking Upper Fort Garry with St. Paul (now MN), the area was initially settled by francophone people of Métis and Québécois heritage. English settlers later came as well, in smaller numbers. Father Noel-Joseph Ritchot and Mr. Joseph Dubuc both helped with St. Pierre's founding. The Brittany-born Father Jean-Marie Jolys started a parish and encouraged many Quebec families to move here. The name "Jolys" was added to "St. Pierre" around 1922 to recognize the 40 years of Father Jolys as parish priest of St. Pierre. The Roman Catholic faith has been inextricably linked to the settlement's growth. A former convent of the Sisters of the Holy Names of Jesus and Mary is now the village museum. Though the post office opened in 1879, St. Pierre-Jolys was only incorporated as a village in 1947.

A unique part of the area's history was the establishment of a POW camp during World War II 6 miles south of St. Pierre in 1943, the camp held about 200 prisoners working on a sugar beet farm.

Demographics 

Notable people
Rich Gosselin, hockey player
Mariette Mulaire, businesswoman

See also 
Franco-Manitoban

References

External links 

 

Saint Pierre
Urban municipalities in Eastman Region, Manitoba
Manitoba communities with majority francophone populations